The Empire Award for Best British Actress was an Empire Award presented annually by the British film magazine Empire to honor a British actress who has delivered an outstanding performance in a leading role, while working within the film industry. The Empire Award for Best British Actress was first introduced at the 1st Empire Awards ceremony in 1996, with Kate Winslet receiving the award for her role in Heavenly Creatures, and last presented at the 10th Empire Awards ceremony in 2005. It was one of three Best British awards retired that year (the others being Best British Actor and Best British Director). Winners were voted by the readers of Empire magazine.

Since its inception, the award has been given to six actress. Kate Winslet had received the most awards in this category, with five awards, and was nominated on six occasions, more than any other actress. Winslet was the last winner in this category, for her role in Eternal Sunshine of the Spotless Mind.

Winners and nominees
In the list below, winners are listed first in bold, followed by the other nominees. The number of the ceremony (1st, 2nd, etc.) appears in parentheses after the awards year, linked to the article (if any) on that ceremony.

1990s

2000s

Multiple awards and nominations

Multiple awards
The following individual received two or more Best British Actress awards:

Multiple nominations
The following individuals received two or more Best British Actress nominations:

References

External links

Actress
Film awards for lead actress